Weimar (formerly, "New England Mills" or "Weimer") is an unincorporated community in Placer County, California, located in the Sacramento area. As of 2010, its population is 209.

History

The Weimar post office opened in 1866. An explanation of the town's name comes from the Geisendorfer family; descendants of George Geisendorfer, founder of the town. George Geisendorfer was born in the area of Weimar, Germany. Many of the original inhabitants of Weimar (New England Mills) were also of German descent. Members of the town, and the Geisendorfer family, have testified that George Geisendorfer himself decided to rename the town “Weimar” when the post office rejected the original name of New England Mills. In April, 1919, in the wake of the end of World War I, a resolution was introduced in the California State Senate to change the town's name to Argonne. The resolution was defeated after the local senator insisted the name was not German, but actually came from Weimah, a chief of the Grass Valley tribe of Southern Paiute Native Americans, who had been hospitable to the area's first white settlers. The senator further stated that postal authorities had misspelled the name.

Geography
By car, Weimar is about 80 minutes from Reno, Nevada and about one hour northeast of Sacramento, California on east I-80. It is directly adjacent to Interstate 80. Amtrak stops at Colfax, California which is about 5 miles east on I-80 past Weimar. Weimar, California was originally named "New England Mills" and also formerly spelled "Weimer". The elevation is about 2300–2600 feet.

Climate
Weimar has a hot-summer Mediterranean climate (Köppen climate classification Csa).

There are cool winters during which intense rainfall with occasional days of snow. It has hot, dry summers with no rainfall in July and August.

There are on average 77.9 days with measurable precipitation.

Weimar's Köppen classification and climate similarities to locations such as Napa, California and parts of Italy make it a suitable region for growing wine grapes. Weimar and the surrounding areas of Placer County are home to over 20 wineries.

Demographics

Its ZIP code is 95736 and its area code 530.

As of 2010, its population is 209.

Education
The former Weimar Sanitorium, a Tuberculosis treatment hospital, is now Weimar Institute, home to the NEWSTART Lifestyle Program. The Institute also includes Weimar College, and Weimar Academy, a boarding school for high school students, both associated with the Seventh-day Adventist Church.  It is also home to the Weimar Hills Public School, which offers grades 4th through 8th.

References

Unincorporated communities in Placer County, California
Colfax, California
Unincorporated communities in the Sacramento metropolitan area
Unincorporated communities in California